Tapline Road can mean either of the following:

 Petroleum Road - The section of the road that goes through the Golan
 Trans-Arabian_Pipeline#Tapline_Road - the section that runs through Saudi Arabia